Ronaldo Rogério de Freitas Mourão (25 May 1935 – 25 July 2014) was a Brazilian astronomer and the founder of the Museum of Astronomy and Related Sciences (Museu de Astronomia e Ciências Afins) (MAST), as well as a researcher and titular partner at the Brazilian History and Geography Institute (Instituto Histórico e Geográfico Brasileiro) (IGHB). He was born and died in Rio de Janeiro.

References

External links
Official site
MAST

1935 births
2014 deaths
Brazilian astronomers
20th-century astronomers
Democratic Labour Party (Brazil) politicians
Brazilian Democratic Movement politicians
Christian Democracy (Brazil) politicians